"Knockin' da Boots" is the debut single by R&B group H-Town, taken from their debut album Fever for da Flavor. The song became one of the biggest R&B singles of 1993 according to the Billboard charts, where it peaked at number three for seven weeks, and also topped the R&B chart for four weeks, and it helped win the band a Soul Train Music Award for Best R&B/Soul or Rap New Artist. The song was certified platinum by the Recording Industry Association of America and sold over 1.1 million copies. The song contains replayed elements of "Be Alright" by Zapp.

In a profile of distinguished lawyer Kristine A. Huskey, Marie Claire magazine reported that Huskey had appeared as a dancer in the song's music video while attending law school.

Track listing
 "Knockin' da Boots" (Album Version) 5:29
 "Knockin' da Boots" (Single Version) 4:33
 "Knockin' da Boots" (Instrumental) 5:29
 "H-Town Bounce" (Album Version) 3:43
 "H-Town Bounce" (Instrumental) 3:43

Charts

Weekly charts

Year-end charts

See also
R&B number-one hits of 1993 (USA)

References

1993 debut singles
H-Town (band) songs
Luke Records singles
Songs written by Roger Troutman
1993 songs